Veit Stoss (also: Veit Stoß and Stuoss; ; before 1450about 20 September 1533) was a leading German sculptor, mostly working with wood, whose career covered the transition between the late Gothic and the Northern Renaissance. His style emphasized pathos and emotion, helped by his virtuoso carving of billowing drapery; it has been called "late Gothic Baroque".  He had a large workshop, and in addition to his own works there are a number by pupils. He is best known for the altarpiece in St. Mary's Basilica in Kraków, Poland.

Life
According to the contracts and other official documents written in the fifteenth and sixteenth centuries, Stoss was born in a place pronounced as Horb or Horbn. Most researchers identify this place with Horb am Neckar near Stuttgart in Germany. However, there are artistic traces indicating that Stoss's early education could take place in the modern Switzerland. Moreover, his brother was certainly born in Aarau in northern Switzerland, which suggests that the artist's family lived in the region and that Stoss was rather born in the town of Horben, located 30 km southeast of Aarau
His exact date of birth is unknown though it must have been shortly before 1450. Nothing about his life is known for certain before 1473 when he moved to Nuremberg in Franconia and married Barbara Hertz. Their eldest son Andreas was born there before 1477, when Stoss moved to Kraków, the royal capital of Poland, where he was commissioned to produce the enormous polychrome wooden Altar of Veit Stoss (Ołtarz Wita Stwosza) at St Mary's Church in Kraków. His son Stanisław was also a sculptor. Veit lived and worked in Kraków for the next twenty years. His name is usually polonized as Wit Stwosz.

In Kraków
The altar in Kraków was completed in 1489, and was the largest triptych of its time. Like Stoss' other large works, it required a large workshop including specialized painters and gilders.  Other important works from Stoss' period in Poland were the tomb of Casimir IV in Wawel Cathedral, the marble tomb of Zbigniew Oleśnicki in Gniezno, and the altar of Saint Stanislaus.  The Polish court was more aware of Italian styles than Nuremberg patrons of that time, and some of Stoss' Polish work used Renaissance classical ornament.

During World War II, on the order of Hans Frankthe Governor-General of that region of occupied Polandthe dismantled Altar was shipped to Nazi Germany around 1941. It was rediscovered in 1945 in Bavaria, hidden in the basement of the heavily bombed Nuremberg Castle. The High Altar underwent major restoration work in Poland and was put back in its place at the Basilica ten years later.

Nuremberg

In 1496, Stoss returned to Nuremberg with his wife and eight children. He reacquired his citizenship for three gulden and resumed his work there as a sculptor. Between 1500 and 1503 he carved an altar, now lost, for the parish church of Schwaz, Tyrol of the "Assumption of Mary".  In 1503, he was arrested for forging the seal and signature of a fraudulent contractor and was sentenced to be branded on both of his cheeks and prohibited from leaving Nuremberg without the explicit permission of the city council. He was pardoned in 1506 by Emperor Maximilian and restored of his civil rights.

Despite the prohibition he went to Münnerstadt in 1504, to paint and gild the altarpiece that Tilman Riemenschneider had left in plain wood ten years earlier, presumably according to his contract (unlike Stoss, his workshop did not include painters and gilders).  Leaving wood sculpture unpainted was a new taste at the time, and "perhaps the tastes of the city council were somewhat provincial." He also created the altar for Bamberg Cathedral and various other sculptures in Nuremberg, including the Annunciation and Tobias and the Angel. In 1506 he was arrested a second time. In 1507, Emperor Maximilian wrote a letter of pardon. The sole argument was made on the account of his genius. The council of the Imperial free city Nuremberg refused to give him a public notice. But Maximilian's intervention saved him from the dungeons and having his hands chopped off. He was able to resettle in Nuremberg from 1506, but was shunned by the council and received few large commissions from that time onwards. In 1512, the Emperor asked Stoss to help with the planning of his tomb monument, which was eventually placed in the Hofkirche, Innsbruck; it seems Stoss's attempts to cast in brass were unsuccessful.

During the period 1515–1520, Veit Stoss received a commission for sculptures by Raffaele Torrigiani, a rich Florentine merchant.  In 1516 he made Tobias and the Angel (now in Germanisches Nationalmuseum, Nuremberg), and a statue of Saint Roch for the Basilica of Santissima Annunziata in Florence. This wooden statue represents the saint in a traditional way: in the garb of a pilgrim, lifting his tunic to demonstrate the plague sore in his thigh. Even Giorgio Vasari, who did not think much of artists north of the Alps, praised it in his Le Vite and called it "a miracle in wood", though misattributing it.

Veit Stoss was buried at St. Johannis cemetery in Nuremberg. His artistic legacy was continued by his son Stanisław.

In popular culture
Veit Stoss is featured in Judith Weir's opera, The Black Spider. He is one of the singing sculptors in Act 3 Scene 2 inside the Wawel Cathedral. He is shown chiseling at the tomb of King Casimir IV.
There is a Polish book (1913) and film (1961) Historia żółtej ciżemki (The story of a yellow crakow) about Veit Stoss in Cracow.

Notes and references

Sources

Further reading

External links

Robin Pilch Craren (2012): VEIT STOSS/WIT STWOSZ CONTEXTUALIZED WITHIN THE POLISH TRADITION OF SCULPTURE IN THE LATE FIFTEENTH CENTURY, M A Thesis, fulltext, pictures, 118 pp 
St. Mary's Altar by Veit Stoss, Cracow 2010, detailed videodocument
Story of the Cracow altarpiece
 Web Gallery of Art: STOSS Veit
 Stoss carving in the Victoria and Albert Museum, London
 Profile of Veit Stoss (Wit Stwosz) at Culture.pl

Gothic sculptors
15th-century German sculptors
German male sculptors
16th-century German sculptors
German woodcarvers
15th-century births
1533 deaths
People from Horb am Neckar
Artists from Nuremberg
German Roman Catholics